Hoberg is a surname. Notable people with the surname include:

Christine Hoberg, American singer, songwriter and electronic music producer
Dwaine Hoberg (1925–1984), American football coach and politician
George Hoberg (1904–1970), Californian businessman
Margaret Hoberg Turrell (1890-1948), American composer
Pat Hoberg (born 1986), American baseball umpire
Rick Hoberg (born 1952), American comics artist and animator